Michael or Mike Joyce may refer to:

Michael Joyce (writer) (born 1945), American author and professor of English
Michael Joyce (tennis) (born 1973), American tennis player
Michael S. Joyce (1942–2006), American conservative activist
Michael T. Joyce (born 1949), judge of the Pennsylvania Superior Court
Michael Joyce (Irish politician) (1851–1941), Member of Parliament for Limerick City, 1900–1918
Mike Joyce (musician) (born 1963), English drummer for The Smiths
Mike Joyce (baseball) (born 1941), former relief pitcher in Major League Baseball
Mike Joyce (golfer) (born 1939), American professional golfer